Leslie Allen Jordan (April 29, 1955 – October 24, 2022) was an American actor, comedian, writer, and singer. His television roles include Beverley Leslie on Will & Grace (2001–2006 and 2017–2020), several characters on television in the American Horror Story franchise (2013–2019), Sid on The Cool Kids (2018–2019), Phil on Call Me Kat (2021–2022), and  Lonnie Garr on Hearts Afire (1993–1995). On stage, he played Earl "Brother Boy" Ingram in the 1996 play Sordid Lives, later portraying the character in the 2000 film of the same name. During the COVID-19 pandemic, Jordan became an Instagram contributor, amassing 5.8 million followers in 2020, and published his autobiography How Y'all Doing? Misadventures and Mischief from a Life Well Lived in April 2021.

Early life
Jordan was born on April 29, 1955, and was raised in Chattanooga, Tennessee. He graduated from Brainerd High School. Jordan said his mother, Peggy Ann Jordan (née Griffin; 1935–2022), was supportive and accepting, despite never truly understanding him. Jordan's father, Allen Bernard Jordan, was a major in the United States Army Reserve and died, along with two others, in the crash of a civilian Beechcraft Debonair airplane at Camp Shelby, Mississippi, on March 31, 1967, when Jordan was almost 12 years old. In a 2014 interview, Jordan said that he had a difficult time growing up Southern Baptist. "I was baptized 14 times. Every time the preacher would say, 'Come forward, sinners!' I'd say, 'Oooh, I was out in the woods with that boy. I better go forward.'"

Jordan moved to Los Angeles in 1982, where he became involved with drugs and alcohol and was arrested several times. He began to journal daily, which helped him recover from drug and alcohol abuse. In 2010, Jordan told talk show host Wendy Williams that he had been sober for 13 years. In the same appearance, Jordan said that before he gave up drinking, he once shared a cell with Robert Downey Jr., and when they both appeared later on Ally McBeal, Downey couldn't quite place where they had met before.

He was openly gay. Early in the AIDS crisis, Jordan became involved in AIDS Project Los Angeles (APLA) as a buddy and as a food delivery-person for Project Angel Food.

Career

Film and television
Jordan began his career in 1986, appearing as Malone in the adventure series The Fall Guy. He quickly became recognizable in the industry for his diminutive size and Southern drawl. He appeared as newspaper editor Mr. Blackly in the movie The Help. His television career includes guest appearances on Murphy Brown, Designing Women, Will & Grace, Lois & Clark: The New Adventures of Superman, Star Trek: Voyager, Caroline in the City, Pee-Wee's Playhouse, Reba, Boston Public, Boston Legal, Nash Bridges, American Horror Story, and Hearts Afire. In 1990, Jordan portrayed the ski patrol director in Ski Patrol. In 2007, he guest-starred on the comedy drama Ugly Betty as celebrity-trasher Quincy Combs, and starred as Jesse Joe in the short-lived CW television program Hidden Palms.

On the television series Will & Grace, Jordan played Beverley Leslie, Karen's pretentious, sexually ambiguous rival, for which he received an Emmy Award for Outstanding Guest Actor in a Comedy Series at the 58th Annual Primetime Emmy Awards in 2006. His Emmy Award earned him an invitation to present the awards for Outstanding Writing for a Comedy Series and Outstanding Directing for a Comedy Series at the 2006 Emmy Awards with Cloris Leachman a week later. Jordan starred in the pilot episode of Laugh Out, the world's first interactive, gay-themed comedy show. On August 18, 2014, Jordan became a housemate in the fourteenth season of the British reality game show Celebrity Big Brother. He was the second person to leave the Big Brother house (August 29, 2014). In January 2015, Jordan guest-starred in the British sitcom Benidorm for two episodes, as the character Buck A. Roo. On November 1, 2017, Jordan appeared in the new British television drama Living the Dream, produced jointly by Sky and Big Talk Productions, but branded as a Sky Original Production. In 2018–2019, Jordan starred in the Fox sitcom The Cool Kids, along with Martin Mull, Vicki Lawrence, and David Alan Grier.

On April 2, 2020, it was announced Jordan would play the series regular role of Phil in the Fox sitcom Call Me Kat, along with Mayim Bialik, Swoosie Kurtz, Kyla Pratt, and Cheyenne Jackson. The show premiered in January 2021. The same year, Jordan was a guest panelist on season six of The Masked Singer during Week 5 where he also did a performance of "This Little Light of Mine" as "Soft Serve". He later returned as a guest panelist in season seven and season eight. A posthumously-airing holiday episode of Lego Masters was one of his final works before his death.

Theatre
Jordan played Earl "Brother Boy" Ingram in Sordid Lives, and also portrayed this character in the popular cult film of the same name. Jordan reprised the role in a televised spin-off of the movie, which aired on Logo, where he played a character who is institutionalized in a mental hospital. He wrote and starred in the autobiographical play Lost in the Pershing Point Hotel, which was also made into a motion picture. In 2004, he toured the country performing his one-man stage comedy, Like a Dog on Linoleum, to generally favorable reviews.

Jordan's first autobiographical stage show was called Hysterical Blindness and Other Southern Tragedies That Have Plagued My Life Thus Far, with music and lyrics by Joe Patrick Ward. The production, in which Jordan was backed by a gospel choir singing satirical songs about racism and homophobia, was produced off-Broadway at the SoHo Playhouse and ran for seven months. Next, he distilled his experiences growing up as an effeminate, tiny boy in the South and in show business into an autobiographical one-man show, My Trip Down the Pink Carpet. During the opening of My Trip Down the Pink Carpet, Jordan's microphone stopped working, but he kept on with the show like nothing happened; the show was a success. After touring the nation for several months with the production, the show opened off-Broadway at the Midtown Theater on April 19, 2010. The show was produced by Jordan's friend, actress Lily Tomlin. Jordan announced on The Paul O'Grady Show that he would be bringing his show to London's Apollo Theatre.

Music
Jordan released the gospel music album Company's Comin''' in 2021.

Social media
At the time of his death, Jordan had accumulated 5.8 million Instagram followers. His following grew substantially in response to his comedy posts during the COVID-19 pandemic.

Death
On October 24, 2022, at approximately 9:30 am PDT, while driving to film scenes at the Call Me Kat set, Jordan's car, a late model BMW 2 series Gran Coupe, hit the side of a building at Cahuenga Boulevard and Romaine Street in Hollywood. He was believed to have experienced a medical episode that led to the crash. Jordan was pronounced dead at the scene. He was 67 years old.

In January 2023, an autopsy report revealed Jordan died by "sudden cardiac dysfunction". According to the Los Angeles County Coroner's Office, Jordan died from sudden cardiac dysfunction due to arteriosclerotic cardiovascular disease. There was no evidence of drugs or alcohol in Jordan's system. At the time of his death, he had been sober for more than two decades.

Awards
In 2021, Jordan received GALECA: The Society of LGBTQ Entertainment Critics' Timeless Star award, the group's career achievement honor given to "an actor or performer whose exemplary career is marked by character, wisdom and wit." Jordan accepted the award, previously bestowed on Jane Fonda, Meryl Streep, John Waters, Harvey Fierstein, Lily Tomlin, Dame Angela Lansbury, and Sir Ian McKellen, in the Society's Dorian Awards 'Toast' TV 

He also won an Outstanding Guest Actor in a Comedy Series Emmy Award in 2006 for his part as Beverley Leslie in Will & Grace.

Credits
Writer
 Lost in the Pershing Point Hotel (play)
 My Trip Down the Pink Carpet (2008)
 Hysterical Blindness and Other Southern Tragedies That Have Plagued My Life Thus Far How Y'all Doing?: Misadventures and Mischief from a Life Well Lived (2021)

Stage
 Found a Peanut (1986)
 Sordid Lives (1996)
 Southern Baptist Sissies (2000)
 Lost in the Pershing Point Hotel Like a Dog on Linoleum (2004)
 My Trip Down the Pink Carpet (2010)
 Lucky Guy (2011); off-Broadway musical, in the role of Big Al Wright

Filmography
Film

Television

Discography
 Company's Comin''' (April 2, 2021)

References

External links

 
 Leslie Battles for Gay Games Glory 
 Leslie Jordan Interview
 
 
 

1955 births
2022 deaths
20th-century American comedians
20th-century American male actors
21st-century American comedians
21st-century American male actors
American Internet celebrities
American LGBT dramatists and playwrights
American expatriates in England
American gay actors
American gay writers
American male comedians
American male film actors
American male stage actors
American male television actors
American male voice actors
Deaths from arteriosclerosis
Gay comedians
LGBT people from Tennessee
Male actors from Memphis, Tennessee
People from Chattanooga, Tennessee
Primetime Emmy Award winners
Writers from Tennessee
American LGBT comedians